Cyrus William Davis (September 25, 1856 – November 1, 1917) was an American politician from Maine. Davis was a Democrat from Waterville, Maine. He served as that city's mayor from 1903–1904 and as Secretary of State of Maine from 1911–1913. He was born on September 25, 1856 in Buxton, Maine and died in Portland on November 1, 1917. He is interred at Pine Grove Cemetery in Waterville.

The following newspaper article is from the scrapbook of John J. Turner (1858–1937) who knew Cyrus W. Davis from Mr. Turner's time at Casco Castle in South Freeport, Maine from 1902 to 1911.

Text of the newspaper article:

References

1856 births
1917 deaths
Maine Democrats
People from Buxton, Maine
Mayors of Waterville, Maine
Secretaries of State of Maine